Saint-Civran (ultimately from Saint Cyprian) is a commune in the Indre department in central France.

Geography
The river Abloux flows west through the northern part of the commune.

Population

See also
Communes of the Indre department

References

Communes of Indre